L'Aquilon is a Canadian weekly community newspaper, which serves the Franco-Ténois community in the Northwest Territories. The newspaper, which publishes 1,000 copies every Friday, operates from offices in Yellowknife and Hay River.

L'Aquilon was first established in 1986. In 2000, the newspaper was part of a consortium which sued the territorial government over its lack of support for French language institutions.

External links
L'Aquilon

Newspapers published in the Northwest Territories
French-language newspapers published in Canada
Weekly newspapers published in Canada
Mass media in Yellowknife
Newspapers established in 1986
1986 establishments in the Northwest Territories